Madura Madushanka (born 10 January 1994) is a Sri Lankan cricketer. He made his List A debut for Matale District in the 2016–17 Districts One Day Tournament on 18 March 2017. He made his Twenty20 debut on 22 May 2022, for Sri Lanka Navy Sports Club in the Major Clubs T20 Tournament.

References

External links
 

1994 births
Living people
Sri Lankan cricketers
Antonians Sports Club cricketers
Matale District cricketers
Sri Lanka Navy Sports Club cricketers